The Tower of London was a 1905 French short silent film by Georges Méliès.

Plot
Anne Boleyn is locked in Beauchamp Tower in the Tower of London. Falling asleep, she dreams of her past days as Queen of England; then, the vision shifting, she dreams herself condemned to death, and executed in the Tower courtyard. When she awakes, she is indeed sentenced to death, and led out to the scaffold.

Production and release
The film, featuring Marguerite Thévenard as Anne Boleyn, was sold by Méliès's Star Film Company and is numbered 732–737 in its catalogues. Méliès's 1908 American catalogue gives the film the subtitle "The Death of Anne Boleyn, Queen of England," and describes it as a "Dramatic Composition in 5 Scenes."

The Tower of London is currently presumed lost.

References

External links
 

French black-and-white films
Films directed by Georges Méliès
French silent short films
Tower of London